Lemu is a former municipality of Finland and an old church parish dating back to the middle ages. Together with Askainen, the municipality was consolidated with Masku on January 1, 2009.

It is located in the province of Western Finland and is part of the Southwest Finland region. The municipality had a population of 1,603 (2004-12-31) and covered an area of 47.25 km² (18.24 sq mi) (excluding sea) of which 0.11 km² (0.04 sq mi) is inland water. The population density was 34.01 inhabitants per km² (88/sq mi).

The municipality was unilingually Finnish.

See also
Battle of Lemo

External links

Municipality of Lemu – Official website 

Former municipalities of Finland
Populated places disestablished in 2009
2009 disestablishments in Finland